Rajan Ishan (born 29 September 1978) is a Nepali singer-songwriter. He has also acted in movies, Karkash, Awaran, 2 Rupaiyan and Rudrapriya. 

Ishan began making music in 1996 and became popular after the release of Baashma chaina mero mann. Ajhai Yaad Chha is the first single from his latest album and is played on Radio Kantipur. He is one of the highest paid music arrangers and composers in Nepal. Ishan's first movie was Karkash, followed by Awaran, 2 Rupaiyan and Rudrapriya. 

Ishan was one of the mentor judges in the third series of thr popular Nepali reality show Nepali Tara, along with judges music director Prakash Gurung, composer Suresh Adhikari, and singer Ram Krishna Dhakal and fellow mentor, singer Jems Pradhan.  Ishan guided the entrants who made it to the final rounds.

Education
Rajan did his schooling in Nepal and India. After finishing his higher lever education, he joined Sadhana Kala Kendra which is  a  music school in Kathmandu, Nepal.

Personal life
Rajan is born and brought up in Kathmandu, Nepal. He lived in India in his teen days.

Professional career
Rajan's debut song baash maa chhaina mero mann as "my heart is not in my control" became an instant classic hit in 1990s.  
. He is also a music composer and lyricist.

Rajan began his acting career with the film, "Karkash" in 2013. He then acted in "Awaran" in 2014, "2 Rupaiyan" and "Rudrapriya" in 2017

References

External links

  at IMDb

1978 births
Living people
Nepalese composers
21st-century Nepalese male singers
Music arrangers
People from Lalitpur District, Nepal
20th-century Nepalese male singers
Nepalese playback singers